Bill Tveit is an American politician. He has been a Republican member of the North Dakota House of Representatives representing District 33 since December 1, 2018. His current term ends on December 1, 2022. Tveit is on the Agriculture and Human Services Committees. He lives in Hazen, North Dakota.

Tveit is married to Laurel Tveit and has three children. He attended the North Dakota State College of Science. He has served in the army.

References 

North Dakota Republicans
Living people
21st-century American politicians
People from Mercer County, North Dakota
North Dakota State College of Science alumni
Year of birth missing (living people)